Zalisec is a small settlement in the Municipality of Žužemberk in the historical region of Lower Carniola in southeastern Slovenia. The municipality is now included in the Southeast Slovenia Statistical Region.

References

External links
Zalisec at Geopedia

Populated places in the Municipality of Žužemberk